William Mahoney may refer to:

William Mahoney (mayor) (1869–1952), Irish-American mayor of St. Paul, Minnesota
William Mahoney (footballer) (1885–1939), Australian rules footballer who played for the Geelong Football Club
William Austin Mahoney (1871–1952), Canadian architect
William B. Mahoney (1912–2004), U.S. journalist and writer who had a successful late-in-life second career as a substance-abuse counselor
William F. Mahoney (1856–1904), U.S. Representative from Illinois
Bill Mahoney (born 1936), Canadian ice hockey player
William P. Mahoney Jr. (1916–2000), United States Ambassador to Ghana

See also 
William Mahony (disambiguation)